is a railway station in Akiha-ku, Niigata, Niigata Prefecture, Japan, operated by East Japan Railway Company (JR East).

Lines

Station layout
The station consists of two ground-level opposed side platforms serving two tracks, connected to the station building by a footbridge. The station is unattended.

Platforms

History
The station opened on 14 April 1954. With the privatization of Japanese National Railways (JNR) on 1 April 1987, the station came under the control of JR East.

Surrounding area
The station is located in a rural area surrounded by rice fields with scattered residences.

External links

 JR East station information 

Railway stations in Niigata Prefecture
Ban'etsu West Line
Railway stations in Japan opened in 1954
Railway stations in Niigata (city)